The Muhammadan Mosque is a historic mosque in Padang, West Sumatra, Indonesia. It was constructed in 1843 and is associated with trade and traders from Gujarat, India mughal. It is located on Batipuh Pasa street in the South Padang District.

See also
 Islam in Indonesia
 List of mosques in Indonesia

References

Mosques in Padang
Dutch colonial architecture in Indonesia
Religious buildings and structures completed in 1843